High school football rivalries in the United States more than one hundred years old include:

See also
 List of high school football rivalries less than 100 years old

References

High School
Rivalries